Regev or Regeb is a Jewish name that may refer to:

Amitai Regev (born 1940), Israeli mathematician
Aviv Regev (born 1971), Israeli computational biologist
Eldad Regev (1980–2006), Israeli soldier
Mark Regev (born 1960), Israeli diplomat
Miri Regev (born 1965), Israeli politician and general
Nir Regev (born 1977), Israeli inventor and founder of the #techtwin life improvement movement.
Oded Regev (computer scientist) (born 1978), Israeli theoretical computer scientist and mathematician
 Oded Regev (physicist) (born 1946), physicist and astrophysicist
Regev Fanan (born 1981), Israeli basketball player
Uri Regev (born 1951), Israeli lawyer and rabbi

See also
Regev's theorem in algebra

Hebrew masculine given names
Hebrew-language surnames